China–Panama relations are the bilateral relationships between the People's Republic of China and Republic of Panama. The relations between Panama and the Qing dynasty began in 1909 and modern relations began on 2 January 1922 between Panama and the Beiyang government of China. After the Chinese Civil War in 1949, relations were maintained with the Nationalist government of the ROC which retreated to the island of Taiwan, a former Qing province and later a dependency of the Empire of Japan that ruled from 1895 to 1945. 

After breaking off relations with the Republic of China in June 2017, Panama established diplomatic relations with the mainland government of the People's Republic of China. On 26 July 2017, PRC's Foreign Ministry spokesman said that the trade office of China in Panama has been upgraded to China's Embassy in Panama on 13 July and has started its business. “History and socioeconomic reality” were cited as reasons. Varela said that the move was backed by diplomatic relationships dating from 1912 and that the move strengthened the existing relationships, despite the fact that those relationships were with the ROC, not the PRC. At the time of the establishment of relations with the ROC, the island of Taiwan was under Japanese control.

History 
It all began with a letter sent in 2015 to the Chinese government that, according to Isabel Saint Malo, Panama's vice president, was titled "Panama wants to make ties with China". The contents of the letter are kept confidential, as well as the reasons of why it was sent. It has also been kept confidential who delivered the letter and assisted in the switchover process, which is only described as "a distinguished member of the Chinese community living in Panama". The ex-ambassador of the US to Panama, John Feeley, said that he had asked Panamanian President Juan Carlos Varela about the switchover in 2016 but Varela lied to him, saying that there were no plans to make the switchover. He also said that Varela did not tell him the truth until 1 hour before the nationwide announcement. Others questioned why the Panamanian government continues to use equipment donated by Taiwan. The Panamanian government initially gave no reason, later saying that one reason was because "China is the second largest user of the Panama Canal" and President Varela said it was because he "couldn't accept it anymore" and "that's what every responsible leader would do". The Panamanian government said that the switchover was to comply with the one-China policy. The ROC government said that Panama was its "number one ally" and that it would not participate in Beijing's checkbook diplomacy. The Taiwanese government complained that Panama maliciously hid the switchover process until the last moment. In the first year of diplomatic relations, 19 treaties were signed. Varela said that its main purpose was to allow Chinese nationals to easily invest in Panama. Controversies over the sudden switchover, included lack of due process, unusually high levels of confidentiality, and the fact that a few weeks before the switchover, Taiwan had donated medical equipment to Panama. In 2018, the first flight from Beijing To Panama by Air China landed in Tocumen International Airport, with a technical stop in Houston. Varela called it a milestone in Panamanian aviation. Due to this new route, the Panamanian ministry of tourism expected at least 40,000 Chinese tourist visits per year. “History and socioeconomic reality” were cited as reasons. Varela said that the move was backed by diplomatic relationships dating from 1912 and that the move strengthened the existing relationships, despite the fact that those relationships were with the ROC, not the PRC. As a result, Panama City was almost immediately added to China's list of officially approved tourist destinations.

The Chinese Communist Party (or government) has offered the Panameñista party-led government a free feasibility study for the planned 4th set of locks in the Panama Canal in order to gain a competitive advantage in bids for choosing the company to build the 4th set of locks, not to mention plans for a 1200-hectare industrial park in the Pacific coast and a 4-hectare campus in Amador near the Biomuseo to house the People's Republic of China (PRC)'s embassy in Panama. The Plans for the campus in Amador were later scrapped due to Heavy criticism over the fear that the Chinese flag will be seen before the Panamanian Flag in Cerro Ancon due to its position in Amador, thus potentially giving the idea that Panama is Chinese territory. The Chinese embassy in Amador was suggested by Varela, saying that "Amador has not been used properly, it's an area whose value has to rise." Amador is widely believed to be unsuitable for an embassy, or for placing flags of countries other than Panama. There are also fears that Panama could turn into a conflict zone between the United States of America (US) and the People's Republic of China (PRC), due to Panama's strategic location. A Panamanian government agency later said that the switchover was because of Taiwanese president Tsai Ing-wen's violations and un-acknowledgement of the 1992 consensus regarding China, Taiwan and the One-china policy. Panamanian newspaper La Estrella questioned the reasons Varela initially gave for the switchover, like "China is the world's largest population and the 2nd largest economy and user of the Panama Canal", calling Varela's actions contradictory and saying that the reasons Varela gave were the reality Panama has lived under for decades, so those could not be regarded as valid reasons for the switchover. The same newspaper also says that China's plans in Latin America convince Latin American nations easily, with apparent benefits in the short term but with dependency in China in the long term and that China is silently invading other countries and Latin America in general. There are also concerns that, in the long term, Chinese investments may control the Panamanian economy.

On December 2, Chinese president and general secretary of the Chinese Communist Party Xi Jinping visited Panama as part of a four-country tour, going first to Spain, then to Argentina for the G20, then to Panama and then to Portugal before returning to China. Xi was invited to Panama by the Panamanian president Juan Carlos Varela, who later said that "The Chinese president was impressed by Panama". Varela was criticized for inviting him, and for presumably ordering the closure of Corredor Sur, Balboa, and the Cinta Costera for three hours, even though Xi did not use the Corredor Sur highway. Xi presumably asked to be treated like Barack Obama was treated during his visit to Panama in 2015 and many consider Xi was treated even better than Obama. All of Xi's visits have been met with criticism from the general public. In Portugal, numerous companies have been bought by Chinese companies, with Portuguese Prime Minister Antonio Costa saying that "In Portugal, we are not anxious by the origin of foreign investment" and asked Europe to eschew "the path of protectionism" as EU countries agreed upon a framework regulating foreign investment, specially from China. Chinese residents have become the leading non-European applicants for Portugal's so-called ‘golden visas’, whereby foreigners get residency in return for property investments of at least 500,000 euros. Xi spent 2 days per country. Xi left Panama on December 3 and over a dozen agreements between China and Panama were signed, and a feasibility study about the David–Panama railway was received by Panamanian president Juan Carlos Varela From Xi Jinping. China expects the railway to extend to all of Central America, connecting with the Mexican railway network.

Panama has received from China the status of Most Favored Nation, which means that Panamanian ships get special treatment at Chinese ports. But some in Panama are concerned about the entry of Chinese companies onto the Panamanian ship registering business. Chinese tourists can only enter Panama in groups with a guide. In Panama there are two kinds of visa: Restringed visa and Stamped Visa. The Stamped visa is easier to get and Chinese tourists only require the latter, as formerly they required both visas. Xi Jinping said in the meeting with Varela that "The Chinese people (represented by the Chinese Communist Party) helped Panama become fully independent from the US in the 1960s (referring to Martyrs' Day (Panama)), and that China respects the permanent neutrality of the Panama Canal." Many agree that Xi said so in order to reassure Panamanians that the Chinese Communist Party has no intentions of colonizing Panama, but it was met with criticism, especially since China has not yet signed the Neutrality treaty of the Panama Canal (which has to be signed on the Organization of American States) and many consider the Chinese Communist Party wants to colonize Panama, given the speed its requests are fulfilled by the Panamanian government and the fact that virtually all public construction projects in Panama are being built by Chinese state-owned companies. Varela has said numerous times that all public tenders for construction projects are carried out transparently, even though it is rare for the public to know the details of public tenders. The tender for choosing the construction company for Panama's fourth bridge over the Panama Canal was awarded to China Communications Construction and China Harbour Engineering. Weeks before the end of the tender, these two companies ran ads on television, highlighting the Hong Kong–Zhuhai–Macau Bridge while it was still under construction, presumably to reassure the public that the bridge would be a well built one, since Panamanians are skeptical about Chinese product quality. The ads ran before the winner was announced. The day after Xi left Panama, on December 4, at 11 p.m., President Varela personally ordered the start of construction of the Fourth Bridge over the Panama Canal, highlighting again that it would be built by the same companies that built the Hong Kong–Zhuhai–Macau Bridge. He said that the construction companies were experts, since they had built a 55-km-long bridge and that he was confident about it. Varela also said at the China International Import Expo that his family could not miss the opportunity of doing business with China. (Since Varela's family owns a company that produces alcoholic beverages called Varela Hermanos).

Television Station TVN made an investigation that revealed that China Communications Construction and China Harbour Engineering were under investigation in a Southeast Asian country (presumably Malaysia) over corruption charges related with Malaysia's former Prime Minister, Najib Razak, who is also under investigation over corruption charges related to Chinese investments in Malaysia, something about which Mahathir has been very critical. The Panama–David railway will be built by China, having a maximum speed of 160 km/h (the original plan called for 300 km/h), with a length of over 400 km and a cost of over 5 billion dollars, 85% of which will be paid with a loan from a Chinese state-owned bank. It will be part of China's Belt and Road Initiative, also known as the New Silk Road.  Panama's vice president Isabel Saint Malo showed confidence in the railway, saying that "I believe Panama has the ability to pay off its debt." (Even though Panama has over US$20 billion in debt and presumably none of it has been paid in the last few years).

See also
Foreign relations of China
Foreign relations of Panama

References

 
Panama
Bilateral relations of Panama